Hugh McCulloch (March 9, 1869 – March 27, 1902) was an American poet. Born in Fort Wayne, Indiana on March 2, 1869. He was the grandson of Hugh McCulloch who was Sec. of the Treasury under Lincoln, Johnson, and later Arthur. He attended Harvard University and served as an English assistant there from 1892 to 1894. He later went abroad to devote himself to his literary work. Inspired by the Pre-Raphaelites and decadents, his verse was praised for its "careful technique and reserve power."  His first volume, the Quest of Heracles and Other Poems, was published in 1893. He died on March 27, 1902 in Florence, Italy, shortly before he would have turned 33. Soon after, a volume of his last poems, composed while in Florence, Written in Florence: the Last Verses of Hugh McCulloch, was published. McCulloch was a member of a group of Harvard poets, described by George Santayana as having been "alone against the world", who died young, including George Cabot Lodge, Trumbull Stickney, Thomas Parker Sanborn and Philip Henry Savage.

See also
The Harvard Monthly

Notes

Bibliography
The Quest of Heracles and Other Poems (1893) 
Written in Florence: The Last Verses of Hugh McCulloch (1902) 

American male poets
Harvard University alumni
1869 births
1902 deaths
19th-century American poets
19th-century American male writers